The following is a list of notable deaths in January 1993.

Entries for each day are listed alphabetically by surname. A typical entry lists information in the following sequence:
 Name, age, country of citizenship at birth, subsequent country of citizenship (if applicable), reason for notability, cause of death (if known), and reference.

January 1993

1
Ross Bass, 74, American florist  and politician.
June Clayworth, 87, American actress.
Shalom Cohen, 66, Israeli politician.
Phyllis Hill, 72, American dancer and actress, lung cancer.
Raymond Jack Last, 89, Australian surgeon and anatomist.
Laurence Marks, 77, American television writer (Hogan's Heroes, M*A*S*H, The New Phil Silvers Show).
George R. Mather, 81, United States Army general.
Jean Mayer, 72, French-American scientist.
Cathie Marsh, 41, British sociologist and statistician, breast cancer.
Totò Mignone, 86, Italian dancer and actor.

2
Sean Devereux, 28, British Salesian missionary and aid worker, murdered.
Vladimir Makogonov, 88, Soviet-Azerbaijan chess player.
Rudi Supek, 79, Croatian sociologist and philosopher.
Valerie Wellington, 33, American opera and blues singer, intracranial aneurysm.
Gerald T. Whelan, 67, American politician.

3
Leah Feldman, 93, Odessa-born anarchist garment worker.
Johnny Most, 69, American sportscaster, heart attack.
Simone Vaudry, 86, French film actress.
Will Walls, 80, American football player and coach.

4
Danie Craven, 82, South African rugby player and coach.
Leonard Kibrick, 68, American child actor, cancer.
Shannon Boyd-Bailey McCune, 79, American geographer.
Navalpakkam Parthasarthy, 92, Indian geneticist and United Nations official.
Harold Page Smith, 88, American naval admiral.
Ernest Leo Unterkoefler, 75, American Roman Catholic prelate, Bishop of Charleston (1964–1990).

5
Juan Benet, 65, Spanish novelist, brain cancer.
Yuri Bezmenov, 53, Soviet-Canadian defected KGB agent and journalist, heart attack.
Helmut Bischoff, 84, German Nazi official and SS officer.
George Roseborough Collins, 75, American art historian, Alzheimer's disease.
Westley Allan Dodd, 31, American convicted serial killer, execution by hanging.
Nicholas Mayall, 86, American astronomer, diabetes.
Eliseo Morales, 94, Spanish Olympic rower (1924).
Sisworo Gautama Putra, 54, Indonesian film director.
Maynard Street, 94, American football and basketball coach.

6
Archduchess Elisabeth of Austria, 70, Austrian royal.
Ștefan Baciu, 74, Romanian-Brazilian poet, novelist, publicist and academic.
Tad Danielewski, 71, Polish-American film director, cancer.
Dizzy Gillespie, 75, American jazz trumpeter, pancreatic cancer.
Richard Mortensen, 82, Danish painter.
Rudolf Nureyev, 54, Russian ballet dancer and choreographer, AIDS.

7
John Cowley, 87, English army officer.
Toshihiko Izutsu, 78, Japanese religious scholar.
Susi Jeans, 81, Austrian-born organist, teacher and musicologist.
Fred Kohler, Jr., 81, American actor.

8
Hans Bertram, 86, German aviator, screenwriter and film director.
Theo Bruins, 63, Dutch pianist.
Asif Nawaz, 56, Pakistani general, heart attack.
George Rudé, 82, British marxist historian.
Leonard A. Scheele, 85, American physician, surgeon general (1948–1956).
Herbert Trantow, 89, German film score composer.
Hakija Turajlić, 56-57, Bosnian politician and deputy prime minister (since 1992), killed in action.

9
Bruce Campbell, 80, English ornithologist.
Anton Crihan, 99, Moldovan politician, author, economist, and journalist, cancer.
Paul Hasluck, 87, Australian politician, governor-general (1969–1974), MP (1949–1969), prostate cancer.
Keith Mwila, 43, Zambian boxer and Olympic medalist.
Viveca Serlachius, 69, Finnish-Swedish actress.
Judit Tóth, 86, Hungarian gymnast and Olympic medalist.
Janet Vaughan, 93, English physiologist.

10
Diana Adams, 66, American ballet dancer.
Adam Aston, 90, Polish-English singer.
Maurice Brooks, 92, American naturalist.
Thomas B. Curtis, 81, American politician.
Luther Gulick, 100, American social scientist.
Georges Mounin, 82, French linguist.
Raja Perempuan Zainab II, 75, Malaysian royal.

11
Roberto Lucifero d'Aprigliano, 89, Italian lawyer and politician.
Lacey Fosburgh, 50, American writer (Closing Time: The True Story of the Goodbar Murder), breast cancer.
Frank Quinn, 65, American baseball player.
Makhdoom Muhammad Zaman Talib-ul-Mola, 73, Pakistani politician, scholar and poet.
Tommy Walker, 77, Scottish football player.

12
Earl Browne, 81, American baseball player and manager.
Józef Czapski, 96, Polish artist, author, and critic.
Fred Koenig, 61, American baseball, coach and director.
Pierre Nihant, 67, Belgian cyclist.
Joe Orrell, 75, American baseball player.
Yehezkel Streichman, 87, Israeli painter.
Margit Tøsdal, 74, Norwegian politician.
Tito Warnholtz, 86, German Olympic field hockey player (1936).

13
Edivaldo Martins Fonseca, 30, Brazilian footballer, traffic collision.
Camargo Guarnieri, 85, Brazilian composer.
Helene J. Kantor, 73, American archaeologist and art historian.
Ndrek Luca, 65, Albanian stage, film and theater actor.
René Pleven, 91, French politician and prime minister (1950–1951, 1951–1952), heart failure.
Alexander Soper, 88, American art historian.
Charles Tillon, 95, French politician.

14
Victor Abens, 80, Luxembourgian politician.
Victor Warrender, 1st Baron Bruntisfield, 93, British politician.
Sathasivam Krishnakumar, 33, Sri Lankan Tamil rebel and Tamil Tigers leader, suicide.
Manfred Lachs, 78, Polish diplomat and jurist.
Pepita Ferrer Lucas, 54, Catalan chess player.
Robert A. Mattey, 82, American special effects artist (Jaws, Mary Poppins, The Absent-Minded Professor).
José Comas Quesada, 64, Spanish watercolor painter.

15
Billy Brown, 82, English football player.
Sammy Cahn, 79, American lyricist ("Ain't That a Kick in the Head?", "Let It Snow! Let It Snow! Let It Snow!", "It's Been a Long, Long Time"), heart failure.
Arthur Wallis Exell, 91, English botanist.
J. Allen Frear, Jr., 89, American businessman and politician.
Lucien Grosso, 60, French Olympic bobsledder (1956).
William G. Hardwick, 82, American politician.
Henry Iba, 88, American basketball coach.
Annemarie von Gabain, 91, German scholar.

16
Phil Chambers, 76, American actor.
Freddie 'Red' Cochrane, 77, American boxer.
Glenn Corbett, 59, American actor (The Doctors, Midway, Dallas), lung cancer.
Florence Desmond, 87, English actress.
Rafik Khachatryan, 55, Armenian sculptor.
Stan Sheriff, 60, American football player, coach, and college athletics administrator.
Jón Páll Sigmarsson, 32, Icelandic bodybuilder and strongman, aortic rupture.
Đoko Slijepčević, 85, Serbian historian.
Svetozar Vujović, 52, Bosnian and Yugoslav football player and manager.
Atsushi Yamatoya, 55, Japanese film director, screenwriter and actor, esophageal cancer.

17
Barbara Buczek, 53, Polish composer.
Julio Coll, 73, Spanish screenwriter and film director.
Albert Hourani, 77, English historian.
Nick Polly, 75, American baseball player.
Vilmos Zombori, 87, Romanian footballer.

18
Karl Bosl, 84, German historian.
Alfredo Bovet, 83, Swiss-Italian cyclist.
Eleanor Alice Burford, 86, English novelist.
Arthur Donaldson, 91, Scottish journalist and politician.
Gordon Higginson, 74, British spiritualist medium.
C. A. Trypanis, 83, Greek classicist, literary critic, and poet.
Richard Waring, 82, English-American actor.
Wasif Ali Wasif, 64, Pakistani writer, poet and sufi.
Dionysios Zakythinos, 87-88, Greek historian.

19
Holden Furber, 89, American academic.
Reginald Hewetson, 84, British Army officer, Adjutant-General to the Forces.
William LeMassena, 76, American actor (All That Jazz, As the World Turns, See You in the Morning), lung cancer.
Reginald Lewis, 50, American businessman and philanthropist, brain cancer.
Margaret Marquis, 73, Canadian-American film actress.
Nagindas Parekh, 89, Indian writer and literary critic.
Antonello Trombadori, 75, Italian politician, art critic and journalist.

20
Joe Albertson, 86, American businessman.
Joseph Anthony, 80, American playwright and actor.
Françoise Dior, 60, French socialite and neo-Nazifinancier, lung cancer.
Bindeshwari Dubey, 72, Indian freedom fighter, trade unionist and politician.
Audrey Hepburn, 63, British actress (Breakfast at Tiffany's, Roman Holiday, My Fair Lady), Oscar winner (1954), appendix cancer.
Christos Kapralos, 83, Greek artist.

21
Felice Borel, 78, Italian football player.
Charlie Gehringer, 89, American baseball player (Detroit Tigers).
Lotte Laserstein, 94, German-Swedish painter.
Leo Löwenthal, 92, German sociologist.
Dimitris Nikolaidis, 71, Greek actor.

22
Kōbō Abe, 68, Japanese writer (The Woman in the Dunes), heart attack.
Alexander Bodon, 86, Dutch architect.
Patricia Brooks, 55, Lyric soprano, actress, and opera singer, multiple sclerosis.
Jim Pollard, 70, American basketball player and coach.
Erik W. Tawaststjerna, 76, Finnish musicologist, pianist and music teacher.
Brett Weston, 81, American photographer, stroke.

23
Thomas A. Dorsey, 93, American gospel musician, Alzheimer's disease.
Kong Fei, 82, Chinese politician.
Charles Greenlee, 65, American jazz trombonist.
Robert Sutton Harrington, 50, American astronomer, esophageal cancer.
Keith Laumer, 67, American science fiction author.
Gábor Péter, 86, Hungarian communist politician.
Wayne Raney, 71, American country singer and harmonica player, cancer.
Li Ziming, 90, Chinese martial artist.

24
Archduchess Assunta of Austria, 90, Austrian-American royal.
Don Bassman, 64, American sound engineer.
Héctor De Bourgoing, 58, French football player.
Gustav Ernesaks, 84, Estonian composer.
Detlef Gerstenberg, 35, East Germany hammer thrower and Olympian, liver cirrhosis.
John A. Lafore, Jr., 87, American politician.
Thurgood Marshall, 84, American judge, associate justice of the Supreme Court (1967–1991), heart failure.
Éliane Montel, 94, French physicist and chemist.
Uğur Mumcu, 50, Turkish investigative journalist, murdered.
Eino Pentti, 86, American Olympic runner (1932, 1936).
Leland Shaffer, 80, American football player (New York Giants).
Henry Abel Smith, 92, British Army officer.
Sergey Zakharov, 92, Soviet-Russian painter.

25
Frank Freidel, 77, American historian and biographer.
Nils Kristen Jacobsen, 84, Norwegian politician.
Leah Neuberger, 77, American table tennis player.
Hedi Amara Nouira, 81, Tunisian politician, prime minister (1970–1980).

26
Axel Freiherr von dem Bussche-Streithorst, 73, German soldier, resistance member, and diplomat.
Lucia M. Cormier, 83, American politician, member of the Maine House of Representatives (1947–1950, 1953–1960).
Kenneth Gaburo, 66, American composer.
Jan Gies, 87, Dutch resistance member, hid Anne Frank, kidney failure.
Robert Jacobsen, 80, Danish artist.
Jeanne Sauvé, 70, Canadian politician, governor general (1984–1990), MP (1972–1984), Hodgkin's lymphoma.

27
Srđan Aleksić, 26, Bosnian Serb amateur actor and soldier, beaten to death.
Nils Aall Barricelli, 81, Norwegian-Italian mathematician.
Harold Beverage, 99, American inventor and researcher.
J. T. King, 80, American football player and coach.
Leon Mandrake, 81, Canadian magician.
Edward P. Morgan, 82, American journalist and writer.
Erik Mørk, 67, Danish film actor, traffic collision.
Syed Shujaat Ali Qadri, 51-52, Pakistani Grand Mufti, heart attack.

28
Donald Douglas, 81, Scottish surgeon.
André the Giant, 46, French professional wrestler and actor (The Princess Bride), congestive heart failure.
Erik Herseth, 100, Norwegian Olympic sailor (1920).
Helen Sawyer Hogg, 87, American-Canadian astronomer.
Aben Kandel, 95, American screenwriter (I Was a Teenage Werewolf).
Vern Kennedy, 85, American baseball player.
Anatoly Parfyonov, 67, Soviet heavyweight Greco-Roman wrestler and Olympic champion.
Oliver Poole, 1st Baron Poole, 81, British politician, soldier and businessman.
John Steadman, 83, American actor.
Kay Swift, 95, American composer of popular and classical music.
Tim Ward, 75, English football player and manager.
Hannah Wilke, 52, American artist, lymphoma.

29
Adetokunbo Ademola, 86, Nigerian jurist.
Ángel Garma, 88, Spanish-Argentine psychoanalyst.
Gustav Hasford, 45, American novelist, heart failure.
Harris Hull, 83, American brigadier general.
Ron Kostelnik, 53, American gridiron football player, heart attack.
Lars Larsson, 81, Swedish steeplechase runner and Olympian.
Eva Remaeus, 42, Swedish actress, brain tumor.
Nancy Teed, 43, Canadian politician, traffic collision.

30
Ryōichi Hattori, 85, Japanese pop and jazz composer.
James LuValle, 80, American athlete and scientist.
Taikichiro Mori, 88, Japanese businessman and economist.
Svetoslav Roerich, 88, Russian painter.
John Oulton Wisdom, 84, Irish philosopher.
Alexandra of Yugoslavia, 71, Greek-Yugoslavian royal and queen consort (1944–1945), cancer.

31
Paul R. Anderson, 85, American academic.
Ernő Lendvaï, 67, Hungarian music theorist.
John Poulson, 82, British designer and businessman.
Frithjof Ulleberg, 81, Norwegian football player.
Douglas Williams, 75, American sound engineer.

References 

1993-01
 01